Christopher Höher (born 19 May 1997) is an Austrian racing driver.

Career

Formula 3
Höher began his career in racing in 2011 in a Dallara 302 Opel Spiess for Franz Wöss Racing at the Austria Formula 3 Cup at the age of 13 years. His career took off in 2013, two years later, winning the Austria Formula 3 Cup with 12 victories out of 14 races and also competing in races in the German Formula 3 and European F3 Open series. In total, he took part in five races that do not score any points. In the fight for the German Formula 3 trophy he stood three times on the second step of the podium and eventually was classified in tenth position. In the 2014 season, the Austrian decided to continue racing in Euroformula Open Championship. During the second race at Monza stood on the podium. He has collected a total of 35 points, which gave him the fourteenth place in the final drivers' standings.

GP3 Series
In the 2014 GP3 Series season Höher replaced Hong Kong-based Adderly Fong at Jenzer Motorsport for the rounds at the Hungaroring as Fong had a race in the Audi R8 LMS Cup that weekend. In both races he came in the 23rd position. He was classified 36th in the final drivers' standings. In the 2015 GP3 Series season Höher raced at the Silverstone rounds for the Campos Racing team finishing 23rd and 24th.

ADAC GT Masters
Höher participated in the Junior Class of the 2017 ADAC GT Masters season with Audi Sport Racing Academy, sharing the number 9 Audi R8 LMS with Elia Erhart. He finished 15th in the Junior Class standings, scoring 35 points.

BOSS GP
Höher has been competing in BOSS GP since 2016. He drove in the 2016, 2019 and 2020 seasons for Top Speed in the Formula Class, driving Dallara GP2 cars. He will again compete for Top Speed in the Formula class in an ex-GP2 Dallara GP2/11.

Racing record

Career Summary

Complete GP3 Series results
(key) (Races in bold indicate pole position) (Races in italics indicate fastest lap)

Bibliography
 Christopher Hoher

References

1997 births
Living people
Sportspeople from Villach
Austrian racing drivers
German Formula Three Championship drivers
FIA Formula 3 European Championship drivers
GP3 Series drivers
Austrian Formula Three Championship drivers
Euroformula Open Championship drivers
ADAC GT Masters drivers
Team West-Tec drivers
Jenzer Motorsport drivers
Campos Racing drivers
BVM Racing drivers
Ma-con Motorsport drivers